4 All the Sistas Around da World is the debut and sole studio album recorded by American R&B group Sista, released September 20, 1994, on Elektra Records. One of the group members at the time was future rap star Missy Elliott.

Although the album received positive reviews from music critics, the work was eventually shelved due to the first single not having much success on the charts. However, in May 2017, 4 All the Sistas Around da World was officially released on digital and streaming platforms by Rhino Entertainment.

Release and reception

Paul Clifford of AllMusic called the effort a "superb and extremely underrated album," noting the song "Feel of Your Lips" as the highlight.

Track listing
All music by DeVante Swing and Timbaland except where noted.

Chart history

Singles

Outtakes
"You Betta Be Ready" (produced By Timbaland)
"Sweat You Down (Remix) feat. Craig Mack"
"Find My Love (Remix)"
"Brand New (Remix) feat. Static Major & Dalvin DeGrate"
"Brand New (Rap Verses Remix) feat. Static Major & Dalvin DeGrate"

Personnel
Information taken from AllMusic.
album coordination – Crystal M. Johnson
art direction – Alli
bass – Darryl Pearson
creative direction – Dalvin Degrate, DeVante Swing
design – Brett!
executive production – DeVante Swing
guitar – Darryl Pearson
label coordination – Steve Lucas
multi-instruments – DeVante Swing, Timbaland
performer – Missy Elliott, La'Shawn Shellman
photography – Cartel, Daniel Hastings
production – Dalvin DeGrate, DeVante Swing, Timbaland
rapping – Missy Elliott
vocals – Mary J. Blige, DeVante Swing, Cedric "K-Ci" Hailey
vocals (background) – Mary J. Blige, Cedric "K-Ci" Hailey, Virginia Williams,

References

External links
 
 4 All the Sistas Around da World at Discogs

1994 debut albums
Albums produced by Timbaland
Elektra Records albums
Contemporary R&B albums by American artists